Give Us Barabbas! is a 1961 American TV movie. It was written by Henry Denker and directed by George Schaefer. It was an original script for Hallmark Hall of Fame which was rare because that show specialised in adaptations.

Cast
James Daly as Barabbas
Kim Hunter as Mara
Dennis King as Pontius Pilate
Robinson Stone as Phineas
Leonardo Cimino as Caleb
Ludwig Donath as Joseph
Keir Dullea as Elisha
Muni Seroff as Samuel
Toni Darnay as Mary
John Straub as John
John Gerstad as Lemuel

Reception
The Los Angeles Times said the film provided a "tour de force" for Daly who gave "a marvellous characterization." The New York Times said it had "great power".

The show was repeated.

References

External links
Give Us Barabbas at IMDb
Give Us Barabbas at TCMDB

1961 television films
1961 films
Films directed by George Schaefer
Hallmark Hall of Fame episodes
Cultural depictions of Pontius Pilate